The 2019 Masters were held from October 22 to 27, at the North Bay Memorial Gardens in North Bay, Ontario. It was the first Grand Slam and first major of the 2019–20 season.

In the Men's final, Matt Dunstone beat Brad Gushue 8–5 to win the title. It is Dunstone's first Grand Slam final appearance and victory, having only made it as far as the quarterfinals in all of his previous slams.

In the Women's final, Tracy Fleury defeated Sayaka Yoshimura 7–5 to claim the title. It was Fleury's first Grand Slam victory, having finished runner-up at two previous slams. It was also a record set by Yoshimura who is the first women's team from Asia to make a Grand Slam final, excluding defunct events.

The total attendance for the event was about 40,000, a record for any Grand Slam event.

Qualification
The top 15 men's and women's teams on the World Curling Tour order of merit standings as of September 17, 2019 qualified for the event. In the event that a team declines their invitation, the next-ranked team on the order of merit is invited until the field is complete.

Men
Top Order of Merit men's teams as of September 17:
 Kevin Koe
 John Epping
 Brendan Bottcher
 Niklas Edin
 Bruce Mouat
 Brad Jacobs
 Peter de Cruz
 Ross Paterson
 Brad Gushue
 Matt Dunstone
 Yannick Schwaller
 Glenn Howard
 Scott McDonald
 John Shuster
 Mike McEwen

Women
Top Order of Merit women's teams as of September 17:
 Rachel Homan
 Anna Hasselborg
 Kerri Einarson
 Silvana Tirinzoni
 Jennifer Jones
 Chelsea Carey
 Tracy Fleury
 Satsuki Fujisawa
 Casey Scheidegger
 Robyn Silvernagle
 Eve Muirhead
 Sayaka Yoshimura
 Elena Stern
 Anna Sidorova
 Theresa Cannon
 Kelsey Rocque

Men

Teams

The teams are listed as follows:

Round Robin Standings
Final Round Robin Standings

Round Robin Results
All draw times are listed in Eastern Daylight Time (UTC−04:00).

Draw 1
Tuesday, October 22, 7:00 pm

Draw 2
Wednesday, October 23, 8:00 am

Draw 3
Wednesday, October 23, 12:00 pm

Draw 4
Wednesday, October 23, 4:00 pm

Draw 5
Wednesday, October 23, 8:00 pm

Draw 6
Thursday, October 24, 8:00 am

Draw 7
Thursday, October 24, 12:00 pm

Draw 8
Thursday, October 24, 4:00 pm

Draw 9
Thursday, October 24, 8:00 pm

Draw 10
Friday, October 25, 8:00 am

Draw 11
Friday, October 25, 12:00 pm

Draw 12
Friday, October 25, 4:00 pm

Tiebreakers
Saturday, October 26, 8:00 am

Playoffs

Quarterfinals
Saturday, October 26, 12:00 pm

Semifinals
Saturday, October 26, 8:00 pm

Final
Sunday, October 27, 4:30 pm

Women

Teams

The teams are listed as follows:

Round Robin Standings
Final Round Robin Standings

Round Robin Results
All draw times are listed in Eastern Daylight Time (UTC−04:00).

Draw 1
Tuesday, October 22, 7:00 pm

Draw 2
Wednesday, October 23, 8:00 am

Draw 3
Wednesday, October 23, 12:00 pm

Draw 4
Wednesday, October 23, 4:00 pm

Draw 5
Wednesday, October 23, 8:00 pm

Draw 6
Thursday, October 24, 8:00 am

Draw 7
Thursday, October 24, 12:00 pm

Draw 8
Thursday, October 24, 4:00 pm

Draw 9
Thursday, October 24, 8:00 pm

Draw 10
Friday, October 25, 8:00 am

Draw 11
Friday, October 25, 12:00 pm

Draw 13
Friday, October 25, 7:30 pm

Tiebreaker
Saturday, October 26, 8:00 am

Playoffs

Quarterfinals
Saturday, October 26, 4:00 pm

Semifinals
Saturday, October 26, 8:00 pm

Final
Sunday, October 27, 12:00 pm

Notes

References

External links

October 2019 sports events in Canada
2019 in Canadian curling
Sport in North Bay, Ontario
Curling in Northern Ontario
2019 in Ontario
2019